Bharat Vikas Parishad (BVP) (translation: Indian Development Council) is a member of Sangh Parivar.

History 
The BVP, founded in 1963 on the birth anniversary of Swami Vivekananda is a right-wing voluntary organisation. It was initially formed with name - Citizens Council to mobilize people against Chinese attacks on Indian territory but was later renamed and registered as a society on 10 July 1963. Its primary purpose is to organize Indian citizens for philanthropic work. BVP is a member of Sangh Parivar.

Activities 
Bharat Vikas Parishad's manifesto includes social organizing for social reforms.

Donations to fight against Novel Corona Virus 
BVP's regional branches were seen distributing sanitizers and raising awareness about precautions to prevent COVID-19 from spreading. Distribution of ration among people was also done. In September 2020, BVP donated 2.11 crore to the PM Cares fund.

Scholarship for students 
Scholarship for students was also distributed by BVP's regional branches.

Skill development for blinds 
Under a social outreach program BVP hosted skill development program for the blind.

Awards

References

External links 

 

Sangh Parivar
Hindu organizations
Hindu organisations based in India
Hindu relief organizations
Volunteer organisations in India
1963 establishments in Delhi